Rasamee Supamool (born 10 January 1992) is a Thai volleyball player who represented her country at the 2010 FIVB Women's World Championship.

Awards

Clubs 
 2013–14 Thailand League -  Champion, with Nakhon Ratchasima
 2014–15 Thailand League -  Champion, with Bangkok Glass
 2015 Thai-Denmark Super League -  Champion, with Bangkok Glass
 2015 Asian Club Championship -  Champion, with Bangkok Glass
 2016–17 Thailand League -  Runner-up, with Bangkok Glass
 2017 Thai-Denmark Super League -  Runner-up, with Bangkok Glass
 2017–18 Thailand League -  Third, with Bangkok Glass
 2018 Thai-Denmark Super League -  Runner-up, with Bangkok Glass

National team
 2008 Asian Youth Championship -  Bronze Medal
 2010 Asian Cup Championship -  Silver Medal

References

External links

1992 births
Rasamee Supamool
Living people
Volleyball players at the 2010 Asian Games
Rasamee Supamool
Rasamee Supamool
Southeast Asian Games medalists in volleyball
Competitors at the 2011 Southeast Asian Games
Rasamee Supamool
Rasamee Supamool
Rasamee Supamool